Wila Jaqhi (Aymara wila blood, blood-red, jaqhi precipice, cliff, "red cliff", also spelled Huila Jakke, Wila Jakke) is a  mountain in the Bolivian Andes. It is located in the Cochabamba Department, Tapacari Province. Wila Jaqhi lies northeast of the village of Machaqa Marka (Machacamarca).

References 

Mountains of Cochabamba Department